John Robbins Foster (October 15, 1886 – September 3, 1948) was a halfback in the National Football League. He played two seasons with the Racine Legion before playing his final season with the Milwaukee Badgers.

References

Sportspeople from Racine, Wisconsin
Players of American football from Wisconsin
Racine Legion players
Milwaukee Badgers players
American football halfbacks
1886 births
1947 deaths
Sportspeople from the Milwaukee metropolitan area